The 2023 Nashville mayoral election will take place on August 3, 2023, with a runoff on September 14 if necessary. It will select the next mayor of Nashville, Tennessee. Incumbent mayor John Cooper is not seeking re-election to a second term in office. While mayoral elections in Nashville are officially nonpartisan, Cooper is a member of the Democratic Party.

Candidates

Declared
Fran Bush, former school board member
Bernie Cox, candidate for mayor in 2019 (Party affiliation: Republican)
Jim Gingrich, former AllianceBernstein chief operating officer
Sharon Hurt, metro councilor
Freddie O'Connell, metro councilor
Alice Rolli, former aide to governor Bill Haslam and U.S. Senator Lamar Alexander (Party affiliation: Republican)
Matt Wiltshire, former Nashville Metropolitan Development and Housing Agency chief strategy officer
Jeff Yarbro, Minority Leader of the Tennessee Senate (2019–present) from the 21st district (2015–present) (Party affiliation: Democratic)

Formed exploratory committee
Vivian Wilhoite, Davidson County Assessor

Publicly expressed interest
Charles Bone, attorney and candidate for mayor in 2015
Karen Johnson, Davidson County Register of Deeds

Potential
Heidi Campbell, state senator for the 20th district (2020–present) and nominee for Tennessee's 5th congressional district in 2022 (Party affiliation: Democratic)
Lonnell Matthews, juvenile court clerk
Tara Scarlett, education nonprofit CEO

Declined
Megan Barry, former mayor (2015–2018) (Party affiliation: Democratic)
Hal Cato, former nonprofit executive
John Cooper, incumbent mayor (Party affiliation: Democratic)
David Fox, candidate for mayor in 2015
Bob Freeman, state representative for the 56th district (2018–present) (Party affiliation: Democratic)
Odessa Kelly, community activist and nominee for Tennessee's 7th congressional district in 2022 (Party affiliation: Democratic)
Bob Mendes, metro councilor
Jim Shulman, vice mayor of Nashville (running for re-election)
Carol Swain, retired Vanderbilt University professor and candidate for mayor in 2018 and 2019 (Party affiliation: Republican)

Endorsements

Polling

Notes

References

External links 
Official campaign websites
 Freddie O'Connell (D) for Mayor
 Matt Wiltshire for Mayor
 Jeff Yarbro (D) for Mayor

Nashville mayoral
Nashville
Government of Nashville, Tennessee
Mayoral elections in Nashville, Tennessee